Nad Kuh-e Olya (also Romanized as Nad Kūh-e ‘Olyā; also known as Nad Kūh and Natkūh) is a village in Kushk Rural District, in the Central District of Bafq County, Yazd Province, Iran. At the 2006 census, its population was 22, in 6 families.

References 

Populated places in Bafq County